Rubus persistens is an uncommon North American species of brambles in the rose family. It grows in the southeastern and south-central United States from eastern Texas to South Carolina.

The genetics of Rubus is extremely complex, so that it is difficult to decide on which groups should be recognized as species. There are many rare species with limited ranges such as this. Further study is suggested to clarify the taxonomy.

References

persistens
Flora of the Southeastern United States
Plants described in 1903
Flora without expected TNC conservation status